Prince Valdemar of Denmark (27 October 1858 – 14 January 1939) was a member of the Danish royal family. He was the third son and youngest child of Christian IX of Denmark and Louise of Hesse-Kassel. He had a lifelong naval career.

Early life

Prince Valdemar was born on 27 October 1858 at Bernstorff Palace in Gentofte north of Copenhagen. His father was Prince Christian of Denmark, later King Christian IX. His mother was Princess Louise of Hesse-Kassel. He was baptised on 21 December 1858. He had five older siblings: Prince Frederick (1843–1912), Princess Alexandra (1844–1925), Prince William (1845–1913), Princess Dagmar (1847–1928), and Princess Thyra (1853–1933).

Prince Valdemar grew up in an increasingly international family. Despite the fact that the family had limited resources available and lived a relatively bourgeois life by royal standards, Valdemar's siblings managed to enter into some dynastically important marriages. In March 1863, the Danish royal family, including four-year-old Valdemar, travelled to London for the wedding of his eldest sister, Princess Alexandra, to the Prince of Wales, the son and heir-apparent of Queen Victoria. In June of the same year, Prince Valdemar's older brother Prince William was installed as King of Greece under the name of George I. And in November of the same year, his father succeeded to the throne of Denmark as King Christian IX following the death of King Frederick VII.

Prince Valdemar received his early education from tutors. In the summer of 1874, he accompanied his father during his visit to Iceland for the millennium celebrations. After his confirmation in 1874, as was customary for princes at that time, he started a military education and entered the naval college. In 1879, he was sub-lieutenant and in 1880 lieutenant. In the following years, he participated in several naval expeditions. Valdemar was homosexual, and from 1883 lived at Bernstorff Palace near Copenhagen with his nephew Prince George of Greece, who'd been taken as a boy to Denmark to be enlisted in the Danish royal navy, and be consigned to the care of Valdemar, who was an admiral in the Danish fleet. Feeling abandoned by his father on this occasion, George would later describe to his fiancée the profound attachment he developed for his uncle from that day forward.

Marriage
He married Princess Marie d'Orleans on 20 October 1885 in a civil ceremony in Paris. They had a religious ceremony on 22 October 1885 at the Château d'Eu, the residence of Prince Philippe, Count of Paris. The wedding was believed by one source to have been politically arranged, and in France, it was believed that the Count of Paris (the bride's uncle) was personally responsible for the match. However, the same source claimed that "there was every reason to believe that [it was] a genuine love match". At the time of their marriage, it was decided that any sons would be brought up in Valdemar's Lutheran faith, while any daughters would be raised as Catholics, the faith of their mother. The couple's four sons were consequently Lutherans, while their only daughter, Margaret was raised a Catholic and married a Catholic prince. In 1886 the Bulgarian throne was offered to Prince Valdemar, but he and Marie agreed to refuse.

Later life
Valdemar had a lifelong naval career.  He was the first president of the Seamen's Association of 1856.

He died on 14 January 1939 in the Yellow Palace in Copenhagen and was buried in Roskilde Cathedral. He was the last surviving child of Christian IX.

Honours
Danish orders and decorations
 Knight of the Elephant, 15 November 1863
 Cross of Honour of the Order of the Dannebrog, 15 November 1863
 Grand Commander of the Dannebrog, 21 July 1900
 King Christian IX and Queen Louise of Denmark Golden Wedding Commemorative Medal
 King Christian IX Centenary Medal
 Navy Long Service Medal
 Danish Red Cross Badge of Honor
 Commemoration Medal for Danish Prisoners-of-war for the Red Cross

Foreign orders and decorations

Issue

Ancestry

References

Citations

Bibliography

External links

 Prince Valdemar at the website of the Royal Danish Collection at Amalienborg Palace

1858 births
1939 deaths
House of Glücksburg (Denmark)
Danish princes
Burials at Roskilde Cathedral
Grand Commanders of the Order of the Dannebrog
Recipients of the Cross of Honour of the Order of the Dannebrog
Grand Crosses of the Order of Saint Stephen of Hungary
Grand Croix of the Légion d'honneur
Recipients of the Order of the Netherlands Lion
Honorary Knights Grand Cross of the Order of the Bath
Recipients of the Order of the White Eagle (Russia)
Recipients of the Order of St. Anna, 1st class
Recipients of the Order of St. Vladimir, 4th class
Sons of kings
Children of Christian IX of Denmark
LGBT royalty